Brad Rogers Carson (born March 11, 1967) is an American lawyer and politician from the state of Oklahoma who served as the Acting Under Secretary of Defense for Personnel and Readiness from 2015 to 2016. In that role, he initiated a number of notable reforms to include opening up all combat positions to women, open service by transgender service members, and new recruiting and retention practices.

A member of the Democratic Party, he served in the United States House of Representatives from 2001 to 2005. He served as Under Secretary of the Army from 2014 to 2015 and as General Counsel of the Army from 2012 to 2014.

Carson is a senior advisor at the Boston Consulting Group. Carson has also been a professor of public policy for the last two years at the University of Virginia's Frank Batten School of Leadership and Public Policy. He is the only person to have voted on the authorization of the Iraq War in Congress and to have subsequently fought in it. On April 5, 2021, the University of Tulsa announced Carson had been selected to be the 21st president of the university, effective July 1, 2021.

Early life and education
Carson was born in Winslow, Arizona. His father worked for the Bureau of Indian Affairs. During Carson's childhood the family relocated a number of times, resulting in Carson being raised in several different Native American communities, including reservations in Nevada, Arizona, and Kansas, as well as the Eastern Band Cherokee Reserve in North Carolina. As a teenager, Carson moved back to Oklahoma, where his family has roots in the Cherokee Nation, of which Carson is an enrolled member.

Carson studied at Jenks High School and Baylor University, where he was elected to Phi Beta Kappa. He became the first student at Baylor in 55 years to be awarded a Rhodes Scholarship. As a Rhodes Scholar, Carson went to Trinity College, Oxford, and earned a second BA (which became an MA a few years later) in Politics, Philosophy, and Economics. He attended the University of Oklahoma College of Law, graduating at the top of his class in 1994.

According to The Almanac of American Politics, Carson had originally intended to attend Yale Law School, only to change his mind while at Oxford.

Career 
After graduation from the University of Oklahoma, Carson took a job at a prestigious Oklahoma law firm, Crowe & Dunlevy. In 1996, his firm was awarded the Exceptional Contribution to Legal Services Award by Legal Services of Eastern Oklahoma. In 1997 Carson was selected as a White House Fellow, where he was assigned to The Pentagon as a Special Assistant to the Secretary of Defense.

Election to Congress 

In 2000, he was elected as a Democrat to the United States House of Representatives from Oklahoma's 2nd Congressional District, located in the northeastern part of the state. In the primary, Carson defeated long-term state representative Bill Settle, who was chairman of the Appropriations Committee in the Oklahoma House of Representatives.

After redistricting changed the political composition of his district to be much more favorable to a Democratic candidate, Carson was reelected in 2002 with nearly 75 percent of the vote.

During his tenure in Congress, Carson was generally seen as a moderate Democrat.  He was a member of the conservative Democratic Blue Dog Coalition. He served on the Transportation Committee, the Natural Resources Committee, and the Small Business Committee. On October 10, 2002, Brad Carson was among the 81 House Democrats who voted in favor of authorizing the invasion of Iraq.

2004 U.S. Senate election 

In 2004, Carson did not seek reelection to the House, and ran for the open U.S. Senate seat that was being vacated by retiring Republican Don Nickles. He easily won the Democratic primary, and after a tough campaign, lost the election to Republican Tom Coburn, his predecessor in the House. Despite Carson's loss, election analyst Stuart Rothenberg called the Carson campaign the best-run campaign in the nation in 2004. The Weekly Standard called him "The Perfect Democrat"  After the election, Carson wrote an article for The New Republic which was the subject of much discussion. He was succeeded in the House by fellow Democrat Dan Boren.

Post-Congressional work 
After the 2004 Senate election, Carson's term in the United States Congress expired on January 3, 2005; Carson was succeeded by Dan Boren. Carson indicated that he had no immediate plans to seek political office, and, in January 2005, he accepted a semester-long teaching fellowship specializing in U.S. politics at Harvard University. Upon leaving Harvard, he returned to his hometown of Claremore, Oklahoma, and worked as chief executive officer of Cherokee Nation Businesses, which is owned by the Cherokee Nation of Oklahoma in Catoosa, Oklahoma.

As an expert in Indian law, Carson oversaw one of the largest businesses in the state, with thousands of employees, hundreds of millions of dollars in revenue, and more than a dozen in-house lawyers who specialized in Indian and corporate law.  In December 2008, Carson left his post at Cherokee Nation Businesses to deploy to Iraq as an Intelligence Officer in the U.S. Navy.  He was officer-in-charge of weapons intelligence teams embedded with the U.S. Army's 84th Explosive Ordnance Disposal Battalion in the nine southern provinces of Iraq; the teams worked with EOD teams at seven bases and investigated bomb sites, caches, smuggling routes, and other activities related to improvised explosive devices. For this work, Carson received, among other awards, the Bronze Star. On his return, he was elected to the board of Cherokee Nation Businesses.

In January 2010, Carson assumed a position as professor of business and law at the University of Tulsa, and as director of the National Energy Policy Institute, a non-profit energy policy organization funded by billionaire George Kaiser's family foundation. In his academic work, Carson has written extensively about the economics of renewable energy. He has also contributed journalism to The Weekly Standard, The New Republic, Blueprint, and Democracy: A Journal of Ideas. In 2010, Carson contributed to a symposium issue of Democracy: A Journal of Ideas, in which he was one of ten writers (including Martha Nussbaum, Michael Sandel, and others) discussing the future of progressive political thought and politics. He is the author of several other works, including a guide to federal appellate practice, a work co-authored with Judge Robert Bacharach (who was appointed by President Obama to the 10th Circuit Court of Appeals). More recently, he has been working on a long series of articles about military reform for the online journal War on the Rocks.

Carson had met Barack Obama in 2004 when they were both nominees of the Democratic Party for open seats in the United States Senate.  Carson endorsed Obama in 2006 for the 2008 presidential election. Carson served as Obama's personal representative in the approval of candidates for delegates from Oklahoma to the 2008 Democratic National Convention. Oklahoma was the first state to name its complete delegation to the 2008 Democratic Convention.

Return to politics 
In June 2011, U.S. Congressman Dan Boren announced that he would not seek another term. Carson announced shortly thereafter that he would seek to win back his former seat. Despite this announcement, he later announced that he would not seek his old seat after all.

Obama administration 
On September 14, 2011, President Barack Obama nominated Carson to serve as the General Counsel of the United States Department of the Army. The United States Senate confirmed Carson by unanimous consent on December 17, 2011.

On January 6, 2014, President Obama nominated Carson to be Under Secretary of the Army, to replace Joseph W. Westphal, whom the president had nominated to be the United States Ambassador to Saudi Arabia. On February 12, 2014, Carson was confirmed by the United States Senate and he was sworn in as the 31st Under Secretary of the Army on March 27, 2014. Fellow Oklahoma Democrat, Principal Chief Bill John Baker of the Cherokee nation, praised Carson, saying, "I applaud President Obama for nominating Brad Carson to this post [...] Brad is a Cherokee citizen and has committed his life to one of our Cherokee values: serving people. As a U.S. Congressman he served the people of Oklahoma's second district, as a CEO he served Cherokee Nation Businesses and the Cherokee people [...] he will be a champion for our American military in his role as Army undersecretary."

As Chief Operating Officer of the Department of the Army, Carson led day-to-day-business operations of the global U.S. Army business enterprise, with over 490,000 active duty soldiers, 335,000 National Guard soldiers, 200,000 Army Reserve soldiers, and over 330,000 civilians. He supervised the development and submission of the Army's budget, which exceeded $150 billion. In a move lauded by veterans groups, Carson made national headlines when he formally apologized to veterans of the Iraq War for the Army's mishandling of chemical weapons exposures.
Carson served as the acting undersecretary of defense for personnel and readiness from April 2015 until April 2016, resigning while still awaiting Senate formal approval. As undersecretary, Carson led a number of pioneering initiatives such as the Department of Defense's "Force of the Future" reforms, the largest personnel changes to the military and civilian workforce in nearly 50 years. Carson oversaw the historic opening of all combat positions to women. He assisted in the reformation of the military retirement system for the first time in 70 years set policy transgender servicemembers.

Personal life 
Carson's wife, Julie, served on the Oklahoma State Regents for Higher Education. They live in Claremore, Oklahoma. They have one son, Jack.

Electoral history

See also
 List of Native Americans in the United States Congress

References

External links
 

|-

|-

|-

|-

1967 births
21st-century American politicians
Alumni of Trinity College, Oxford
American Rhodes Scholars
Baptists from Arizona
Baptists from Oklahoma
Baylor University alumni
University of Oklahoma College of Law alumni
Cherokee Nation members of the United States House of Representatives
Democratic Party members of the United States House of Representatives from Oklahoma
Living people
Native American members of the United States Congress
Obama administration personnel
People from Claremore, Oklahoma
People from Winslow, Arizona
Southern Baptists
United States Department of Defense officials
United States Under Secretaries of the Army
University of Tulsa College of Law faculty
Presidents of the University of Tulsa